is a song by Japanese pop singer Kana Nishino. It was released as her 12th single on November 3, 2010. The song was marketed as a "heart-warming tender" mid-tempo ballad in the initial press release, also describing the lyrics as being about "scaling up passion to love."

Promotion

The song was used as the insert theme song for the Fuji TV drama Freeter, Ie o Kau. One of the B-sides of the single, "Girls Girls," was used as an image song for fashion magazine Vivi. Nishino promoted the single with several television lives, such as on SMAP×SMAP on November 1, Music Japan on November 7 and Music Station on November 12.

Track listing

Charts

Certifications and sales

Release history

References

External links
Sony Music "Kimi tte" profile 

Kana Nishino songs
2010 singles
RIAJ Digital Track Chart number-one singles
Japanese-language songs
Japanese television drama theme songs
2010 songs
SME Records singles